John A. Canning Jr. is a private equity investor and sports executive.  He is the founder and chairman of Madison Dearborn Partners, the large Chicago-based private equity firm.

Career
Canning was an early investor in private equity in the late 1970s and early 1980s.  Canning founded Madison Dearborn Partners in 1992.  Since then the firm has raised over $14 billion of investor commitments.  Prior to founding Madison Dearborn, Canning and his team had previously made private equity investments for First Chicago Corporation.  Canning joined The First National Bank of Chicago in 1968 and spent 24 years with the bank serving as Executive Vice President of the bank and later as President of First Chicago Venture Capital, the predecessor of Madison Dearborn.

Board Memberships
Canning currently serves on the Boards of Directors of 
 Milwaukee Brewers Baseball Club (Canning is a minority owner)
 Exelon Corporation
 TransUnion
 Northwestern Memorial Hospital
 Children’s Inner City Educational Fund
 The Economic Club of Chicago
 Corning Incorporated

Canning currently serves on the Boards of Trustees of:
 Northwestern University
 Field Museum of Natural History
 Museum of Science and Industry
 Big Shoulders Fund

Canning is a member of the Public Advisory Board of the American Joint Replacement Registry.

Canning also serves as a commissioner of the Irish Pension Reserve Fund, a trustee and chairman of The Chicago Community Trust as well as a director and chairman of the Federal Reserve Bank of Chicago.

Education
Canning received his undergraduate degree from Denison University in 1966 and a J.D. from Duke University in 1969.

Awards 
John Canning Jr. was inducted as a Laureate of The Lincoln Academy of Illinois and awarded the Order of Lincoln (the State’s highest honor) by Illinois Governor Pat Quinn in 2014 in the area of Business & Industry.

References

After the gold rush.  Crain's Chicago Business, December 15, 2003

External links
Madison Dearborn Partners > Principals (company website)

Year of birth missing (living people)
Living people
Private equity and venture capital investors
American sports businesspeople
Denison University alumni
Duke University School of Law alumni
Madison Dearborn Partners